Black Bear Resort is located in the South Eastern Corner of Idaho in Bear Lake County, about  north of  Salt Lake City, UT and about  south of  Jackson Hole, WY. The project originally began in 2002 with an initial plan to develop land adjacent to the Caribou Targhee forest service boundary into  parcels with individual wells.  In 2004 the Idaho Department of Water Resources adopted a water mitigation plan allowing the transfer of water rights from one property in a county to another.  This single act provided the opportunity to secure ample water for a high density housing project like Black Bear Resort.  However, on 31 January 2011, the Idaho Department of Water Resources denied Black Bear Resort's application for water use (see reference in "History" section, below).

Overview 
This resort development proposal is based on three distinct village communities all on or adjacent to Bear Lake. As planned, the development of Black Bear Resort is moving according to three schedules.

The Mountain Community is farthest along.  The entire  have been rezoned from agricultural to large scale development.   The Mountain Community Conceptual Master Plan and the Preliminary Plat for Phase I have been submitted and approved by the Bear Lake County Commission.  Engineering and other work to achieve entitlement for all Phase I properties and the legal right to sell in the open market is underway.  Tom Weiskopf has designed a signature golf course, which has been surveyed onto the mountain plateau.  Seven of eighteen holes plus the teaching facility have been cut and initial work is underway on the remaining holes.  Main roads have been graded and packed with road base, ready for paving.   The first alpine ski runs at the North Face and Cassidy's have been defined.  Custom home sites and development super pads have been surveyed onto the site.  Based on approval of Final Plat, Phase I properties in the Mountain Community will be released in stages.

The Ranches Community is the second of three parts to move toward County approval.  It will consist of four to  ranch sites.  It will be linked to the Mountain Community via US Highway 89 and U. S. Forest Service trails open to ATV, snowmobile, horse and foot traffic.  Eight hundred ninety six (896) acres of mountain land have been acquired and another nine hundred (900) are under a BLM Use Permit.  Development designs are now underway and documentation is being prepared for submittal to the Bear Lake County Planning and Zoning Commission.

The Lake Community is still conceptual in nature. Plans include members of the resort having access to all three communities regardless of where their private property is located inside the resort.

History

References

Geography of Bear Lake County, Idaho